The Columbia River Subdivision or Columbia River  Sub is a railway line running about  from Wenatchee to Spokane, Washington. It is operated by BNSF Railway as part of their Northern Transcon. The original line (built in 1893) was built as part of  James J. Hill's Great Northern Railway transcontinental railway line.

References

External links

BNSF Subdivisions

BNSF Railway lines
Rail infrastructure in Washington (state)
Railway lines opened in 1893